Arshak Hayrapetyan (born 8 November 1978) is an Armenian Freestyle wrestler. He competed at the 2000 Summer Olympics in the men's freestyle 63 kg division, coming in 5th place.

References

External links
 

1978 births
Living people
People from Tsovasar
Armenian male sport wrestlers
Olympic wrestlers of Armenia
Wrestlers at the 2000 Summer Olympics